Tibor Géczi (born 12 June 1965) is a Hungarian biathlete. He competed in the men's 20 km individual event at the 1992 Winter Olympics.

References

External links
 

1965 births
Living people
Hungarian male biathletes
Olympic biathletes of Hungary
Biathletes at the 1992 Winter Olympics
People from Pásztó
Sportspeople from Nógrád County